Colin Carrie  (born April 11, 1962) is a Canadian politician. He is a current member of the House of Commons of Canada, representing the riding of Oshawa in the province of Ontario for the Conservative Party of Canada.

Personal life
Carrie was born on April 11, 1962, in Hamilton, Ontario. He lived in several Canadian cities before settling in Oshawa at age fifteen. He has a Bachelor's Degree in Kinesiology from the University of Waterloo, and was awarded a Doctor of Chiropractic in 1989 from the Canadian Memorial Chiropractic College. Prior to entering politics, he worked as a chiropractor. He is a past executive member of the Durham Chiropractic Society and former Chair of Spinal Health Week in Durham Region, and has been Financial Secretary of the Oshawa Knights of Columbus. Carrie also served as a Director of the Oshawa Progressive Conservative Party Association, before the party's 2004 merger with the Canadian Alliance to form the Conservative Party of Canada.

Political career

Carrie was first elected as Member of Parliament for Oshawa in the 2004 federal election, defeating NDP candidate Sid Ryan and Liberal candidate Louise Parkes in a close three-way race. In the 38th Parliament, he served as a member of the House of Commons Standing Committee on Health.

During this session, he reintroduced Private Member's Bill C-420 An Act to Amend the Food and Drugs Act (previously introduced by James Lunney) to end the listing of vitamins, minerals and related products as drugs under the Canadian Food and Drugs Act. This measure has been criticized by some as removing a safety provision from the regulation of natural health products.  Supporters of the bill argued that it would benefit the position of small producers relative to the pharmaceutical industry. Carrie also served as the founding Chair of the Conservative Party of Canada's Automotive Caucus and was also a member of the Conservative Party of Canada's Energy Caucus and Seniors Caucus.

In a close two-way race with returning NDP challenger Sid Ryan, he retained his seat in the 2006 election as part of the first Conservative government to be elected in Canada in almost 13 years. He once again retained his seat in 2008 federal election. On February 7, 2006, Prime Minister Stephen Harper appointed him to the post of Parliamentary Secretary to the Minister of Industry.

Carrie once again retained his seat in the 2008 federal election. In a two-way race between himself and NDP candidate Mike Shields, Carrie won by a larger margin than his previous two elections.  In November 2008, Carrie was appointed Parliamentary Secretary to the Minister of Health by Prime Minister Stephen Harper.  During the 40th Parliament Carrie resumed his membership on the House of Commons Standing Committee on Health.

In the 2011 federal election, Carrie won his fourth election in seven years. In an historic election which saw the Liberals relegated to the third party and the Conservatives achieve a majority in the House of Commons, Carrie was elected ahead of his main opponent, NDP candidate and CAW President Chris Buckley, receiving a landslide 51.3% support from Oshawa voters. Carrie won by the largest margin of victory in Oshawa since the NDP's Ed Broadbent in the 1980 federal election.

In September 2013, Carrie was appointed Parliamentary Secretary to the Minister of the Environment.

In the 2015 federal election, Carrie won his fifth election victory in Oshawa.  This election saw the Conservatives move from Government to Official Opposition where Carrie was appointed Deputy Critic for Health. Carrie later took on the role of Official Opposition Critic for Health under interim Leader Rona Ambrose.  Following the election of Andrew Scheer as party leader, Carrie was given the international relations file.

Under the leadership of Andrew Scheer, he served as Deputy Shadow Minister/Deputy Critic for Economic Development (S. Ontario) and Canada-US Relations. Following the 2019 federal election, they became full critic roles as opposed to deputy roles.

In June 2019, Carrie presented Bill C-461, "an act to amend the Criminal Code and the Judges Act (trafficking in persons)." The Private Member's Bill was proposed to provide judges training on the consequences of human trafficking and specify the legal definition of "human trafficking." The bill passed first reading. Carrie also worked with Oshawa resident Lisa Freeman, whose father was murdered in 1991, to draft a bill aimed at providing greater transparency victims of violent crime and their families during the parole hearing process. Bill C-466, "An Act to amend the Corrections and Conditional Release Act (disclosure of information to victims)," was tabled by MP Lisa Raitt and passed first reading. However, neither bill became law, as the House of Commons went on summer recess shortly thereafter and the 2019 election followed that. As of October 2020, Carrie is working to again propose the bills.

Carrie now sits as a member on the House of Commons Standing Committee for Veterans Affairs.

After the House of Commons introduced a vaccine mandate, Carrie claimed a medical exemption. He attended House meetings virtually.

In February 2023, Carrie, along with fellow Conservative MPs Leslyn Lewis and Dean Allison, had dinner with Christine Anderson, a Member of the European Parliament representing Alternative for Germany, who was on a Canadian tour of right-wing media and convoy protest supporters. The meeting was condemned by the Centre for Israel and Jewish Affairs, the Canadian Anti-Hate Network, and Prime Minister Justin Trudeau among others, for Anderson and AfD's Islamophobic and antisemitic positions. Conservative leader Pierre Poilievre also denounced Anderson's views as "vile", racist, and said that "it would be better if Anderson never visited Canada in the first place". The three MPs released a joint-statement saying that while meetings with foreign elected officials are ordinary, they were unaware of her or her party's views, and that they condemned racist and hateful views.

Electoral record

See also
 List of University of Waterloo people

References

External links
 Official site
 How'd They Vote?: Colin Carrie's voting history and quotes

1962 births
Canadian chiropractors
Conservative Party of Canada MPs
Living people
Members of the House of Commons of Canada from Ontario
People from Oshawa
Politicians from Hamilton, Ontario
University of Waterloo alumni
21st-century Canadian politicians
Canadian Memorial Chiropractic College alumni